Jacqueline Nwando Olayiwola is an American family physician, public health professional, author, professor, and women's empowerment leader. She is the Senior Vice President and Chief Health Equity Officer of Humana and a chair and Professor in the Department of Family Medicine at The Ohio State University Wexner Medical Center. Prior to her appointment at OSU, she served as the inaugural Chief Clinical Transformation Officer for RubiconMD, an eConsult platform that improves primary care access to specialty care for underserved patients. Olayiwola is dedicated to serving marginalized patient populations and addressing the social determinants through community and technology-based infrastructures of healthcare reform. She has published articles on the use of eConsults and telehealth to provide underserved patients with primary care treatments so that they have a low cost and efficient means of reaching specialized care. Olayiwola has founded numerous non-profits and healthcare start-ups such as GIRLTALK Inc, Inspire Health Solutions LLC, and the Minority Women Professionals are MVPs Program. She has been recognized at the national and international level for her work and efforts to educate, advocate and provide healthcare to those in need. She was named Woman of the Year by the American Telemedicine Association in 2019, and received the Public Health Innovator Award from Harvard School of Public Health in 2019, as well as being named one of America's Top Family Doctors from 2007 to 2008 by the Consumers Research Council of America.

Early life and education 
Olayiwola was born in the United States, while her parents were both immigrants from Nigeria. In 1994, Olayiwola pursued her undergraduate degree at Ohio State University, majoring in Human Nutrition within the College of Human Ecology. Olayiwola graduated in 1997 with a Bachelors of Science and stayed at OSU for her medical degree within Ohio State College of Medicine. She obtained her M.D. in 2001, and then moved to New York City to pursue her Postdoctoral Residency in Family and Community Medicine at Columbia University. Her clinical work was conducted at the New York Presbyterian Hospital and she became the Chief Resident in Family Medicine during her time at Columbia. Following her Residency in 2004, Olayiwola moved to Boston where she completed her Master's in Public Health with a Concentration in Healthcare Management and Policy as a Commonwealth Fund Harvard University Fellow in Minority Health Policy at Harvard University's School of Public Health and Harvard Medical School. During her Masters, Olayiwola also served as an attending physician at Tufts University in Student Health Services.

Non-profit GIRLTALK, Inc 
In 2002, towards the beginning of her residency training, Olayiwola founded the non-profit corporation GIRLTALK (Girls In Real Life Tackling A Livid Killer). She became the chief executive officer of the corporation, a role she held until 2013, and helped organize a community-centered public health approach to provide education and training to minority adolescent females about the sexual health topics, HIV prevention, and the use of popular culture to reduce the risk of infection.

Career and research 
In 2005, Olayiwola was elected to the Governing Council of the American Public Health Association's HIV/AIDS section and became a member of the Minority Women's Health Panel of Experts of the Office on Women's Health of the U.S. Department of Health and Human Services. Olayiwola also started a position as a staff physician and primary care provider at the Community Health Center, Incorporated (CHCI) in Middletown, Connecticut, which is the largest federally qualified health center in Connecticut and provides community-based care to underserved patients. She simultaneously taught and mentored medical students at the University of Connecticut School of Medicine. In 2007,  Olayiwola was promoted to medical director of the Meriden Site of CHCI and she also became Vice President of Medical Staff. The following year, in 2008, she was promoted to Chief Medical Officer and President of Medical Staff of CHCI, where led CHCI to become one of the first organizations in the United States to receive both National Committee Quality Assurance Patient-Centered Medical Home (PCMH) Level 3 Assurance and Joint Commission PCMH accreditation. She was also the youngest CMO in the CHCI's existence. In 2012, she became the Director of the Institute for Community Health Policy at CHCI.

In 2013, Olayiwola was inducted into the American College of Physician Executives and was recruited to the University of California, San Francisco Department of Family and Community Medicine to become an Assistant Professor of Medicine and the associate director of the Center for Excellence in Primary Care. She also practiced primary care as a physician in the Zuckerberg San Francisco General Hospital. In 2015, she was promoted to Associate Professor and Director of the Center for Excellence in Primary Care where she published extensively on the use of eConsults in efficient and optimized primary care. Olayiwola's research at UCSF explored the social determinants of health on clinician burnout and she explored the best practices for integration of safety net primary care into the medical neighbourhood as well as improving access to care through electronic referrals. In 2016, she became the Faculty Co-Lead for the Differences Matter Diversity and Inclusion Leadership Group.

In 2017, Olayiwola then transitioned to a leadership position at RubiconMD, a health technology start up aimed at increasing the use of eConsults in primary care to reduce barriers to accessing specialty care in marginalized patient populations. While serving as the Inaugural Chief Clinical Transformation Officer for RubiconMD, Olayiwola also remained an Associate Physician and Health Sciences Clinical Instructor at UCSF until 2019. She dealt mainly with refugees and immigrants at the Zuckerberg San Francisco General Hospital's Newcomer's Program.

In 2019, Olayiwola became the Professor and Chair of the Ohio State University College of Medicine and Wexner Medical Center in the Department of Family Medicine. She is the Founding Director of the Center for Primary Care Innovation and Transformation, provides clinical care to patients at OCU's East Hospital, and also Directs the OSU Central Ohio Practice-Based Research Network.

Healthcare and advocacy leadership 
Olayiwola has been a member of the advisory board of the Robert Graham Center for Policy Studies in Family Medicine & Primary Care since 2015 and was appointed as the Health Sciences Representative to the Ohio State University Alumni Advisory Council from 2013 to 2019. Olayiwola was also a member of the advisory board for Primary Care Progress and served on the board of Health Insight/Qualis Health until 2019. She is also a member of Alpha Omega Alpha honor society. From 2018 to 2019, she served on the Board of the African Women's Development Fund-USA, a grantmaking foundation that supports organizations working towards the empowerment of African women. Since 2018, Olayiwola has been a board member of We Care Solar, which provides efficient solar energy systems to under-resourced health facilities in African nations and across the globe that lack reliable sources of electricity. She also Founded the Association of Minority Women Professionals in 2016 and continues to manage the events and conferences held by the association geared towards empowering, equipping, and preparing minority women professionals across the United States. Olayiwola also served as a national spokesperson for Text4baby, a program run by Johnson & Johnson to provide education to women from marginalized backgrounds during pregnancy and postpartum periods.

Transforming primary care 
Olayiwola has focused much of her career on harnessing technology to increase access to care for underserved and marginalized populations, working in the areas of health systems reform, practice transformation, health information technology and primary care redesign. In 2014, she founded Inspire Health Solutions, LLC, based out of San Francisco, California and Columbus, Ohio, which aims to support a broad spectrum of institutions in their transition towards innovative healthcare delivery models. She has contributed to primary care transformation and health systems strengthening across the United States and in numerous other countries including the Netherlands, Australia, Ireland, New Zealand, Singapore, Nigeria, and the United Arab Emirates.

Writing 
Olayiwola is an avid writer of poems, and four creative books, including Half Woman, Medicine is Not a Job, Minority Women Professionals (MWPs) are MVPs, and Papaya Head: The Life Cycles of a First-Generation Daughter. She has also written extensively for academic journals and was the Principal Investigator of the first published study analyzing the impact of Patient-Centered Medical Homes on health disparities. In 2019, she published the research she conducted at UCSF, exploring a physician's capacity to address patients’ social needs and physician burnout. She also co-authored several initial papers on the electronic consult (eConsult) and its use in increasing the ease of access to healthcare in marginalized populations.

Awards and honors 
 2019 Harvard Public Health Innovator Award
 2019 Ohio State University College of Medicine Alumni Achievement Award
 2019 American Telemedicine Association Woman of the Year Award
 2016 UCSF Chancellor Diversity Award
 2014 Harvard School of Public Health Emerging Public Health Professional Award
 2014 Marshall Memorial Fellowship
 2014 Hellman Family Foundation Award
 2014 UCSF Young Innovator Award
 2012 Early Career Achievement Award Ohio State University College of Medicine Alumni Association
 2011 Named in the 100 Buckeyes You Should Know Recognition - Ohio State University Alumni Association
 2011 National Medical Association Top 40 Leaders Under 40 Award
 2007-2018 America's Top Family Doctors, Consumers Research Council of America
 2007 Fellow of the American Academy of Family Physicians
 2005 Excellence in Medicine Leadership Award, American Medical Association
 2004 Presidential Scholar, Harvard School of Public Health

Select publications 
 Olayiwola, J.N., Potapov, A., Gordon, A., Jurado, J., Magana, C., Knox, M. and Tuot, D., 2018. Electronic consultation impact from the primary care clinician perspective: Outcomes from a national sample. Journal of Telemedicine and Telecare, p. 1357633X18784416.
 Reines, C., Miller, L., Olayiwola, J.N., Li, C. and Schwartz, E. Can eConsults Save Medicaid? NEJM Catalyst. August 2018.
 Brown-Johnson, Cati G., Garrett K. Chan, Marcy Winget, Jonathan G. Shaw, Kendra Patton, Rumana Hussain, J. Nwando Olayiwola, Sang-ick Chang, and Megan Mahoney. "Primary Care 2.0: Design of a Transformational Team-Based Practice Model to Meet the Quadruple Aim." American Journal of Medical Quality. September 2018.
 Wu, D., L. Saint-Hilaire, A. Pineda, D. Hessler, G. W. Saba, R. Salazar, and JN Olayiwola (November 2018). "The Efficacy of an Anti-oppression Curriculum for Health Professionals." Family medicine. 51, no. 1 (2019): 22–30.
 De Marchis, E., Knox, M., Hessler, D., Willard-Grace, R., Olayiwola, J.N., Peterson, L.E., Grumbach, K. and Gottlieb, L.M. Physician Burnout and Higher Clinic Capacity to Address Patients' Social Needs. J Am Board Fam Med, 32 (1), Jan 2019. pp. 69–78.
 JN Olayiwola and C Magaña. Clinical Transformation in Technology: A Fresh Change Management Approach for Primary Care. Harvard Health Policy Review. Feb 2, 2019.
 Alina Kung, Telly Cheung, Margae Knox, Rachel Willard-Grace, Jodi Halpern, Nwando Olayiwola, Laura Gottlieb. Capacity to address social needs affects primary care clinician burnout. Accepted for publication Annals of Family Medicine (In press 2019).
 De Marchis, E.H., Doekhie, K., Willard-Grace, R. and Olayiwola, J.N., The Impact of the Patient-Centered Medical Home on Health Care Disparities: Exploring Stakeholder Perspectives on Current Standards and Future Directions. Population Health Management. June 2018.

References 

Living people
21st-century American physicians
American people of Nigerian descent
American women physicians
Ohio State University College of Education and Human Ecology alumni
Ohio State University faculty
Physicians from Ohio
Columbia University alumni
Harvard Medical School alumni
Year of birth missing (living people)
Ohio State University College of Medicine alumni
Harvard School of Public Health alumni
American women academics
21st-century American women
Members of the National Academy of Medicine